Memorial Stadium may refer to:

United States
 Memorial Stadium (Bakersfield), Bakersfield, California
 California Memorial Stadium, University of California, Berkeley, California
 Memorial Stadium (Storrs), University of Connecticut, Storrs, Connecticut
 Historic Sanford Memorial Stadium, Sanford, Florida
 A. J. McClung Memorial Stadium, Columbus, Georgia
 Memorial Stadium (Savannah), Savannah, Georgia
 Memorial Stadium (Waycross), Georgia
 Memorial Stadium (Boise), Boise, Idaho
 Memorial Stadium (Champaign), University of Illinois, Champaign, Illinois
 Memorial Stadium (Indiana University old), Indiana University (1925–1959), now known as Tenth Street Stadium
 Memorial Stadium (Indiana University), Bloomington, Indiana
 Memorial Stadium (Fort Wayne), Fort Wayne, Indiana
 Memorial Stadium (Terre Haute), Indiana State University, Terre Haute, Indiana
 David Booth Kansas Memorial Stadium (University of Kansas), Lawrence, Kansas
 Memorial Stadium (Kansas State), Manhattan, Kansas
 Memorial Stadium (Maine), Portland, Maine
 Memorial Stadium (Baltimore), Baltimore, Maryland
 Memorial Stadium (University of Minnesota), Minneapolis, Minnesota (1924–1981)
 Mississippi Veterans Memorial Stadium, Jackson, Mississippi
 Memorial Stadium (Columbia), University of Missouri, Columbia, Missouri
 Memorial Stadium (Lincoln), University of Nebraska, Nebraska
 Memorial Stadium (Wayne State), Wayne State College, Wayne, Nebraska
 Memorial Stadium (Dartmouth), Dartmouth College, Hanover, New Hampshire
 Memorial Stadium (Asheville), North Carolina
 American Legion Memorial Stadium, Charlotte, North Carolina
 Memorial Stadium (University of North Dakota), Grand Forks, North Dakota
 Memorial Stadium (Kent State), Kent State University, Kent, Ohio
Dix Stadium, Kent State University, known as Memorial Stadium from 1969 to 1971, Kent, Ohio
 Gaylord Family Oklahoma Memorial Stadium, University of Oklahoma, Norman, Oklahoma
 Christy Mathewson–Memorial Stadium, Bucknell University, Lewisburg, Pennsylvania
 Memorial Stadium (Clemson), Clemson University, Clemson, South Carolina
 Liberty Bowl Memorial Stadium, Memphis, Tennessee
 Memorial Stadium (Johnson City, Tennessee), listed on the National Register of Historic Places (NRHP) in Washington County, Tennessee
 Memorial Stadium (Alice, Texas), Alice, Texas
 Memorial Stadium (Arlington, Texas), University of Texas at Arlington
 Darrell K Royal–Texas Memorial Stadium, University of Texas at Austin
 Memorial Stadium (Texas A&M–Commerce), Commerce, Texas
 Memorial Stadium (Mesquite, Texas), Mesquite, Texas
 Pasadena Memorial Stadium, also known as Veterans Memorial Stadium, Pasadena, Texas
 Memorial Stadium (Tarleton State), Stephenville, Texas
 Memorial Stadium (Wichita Falls), Wichita Falls, Texas
 Memorial Stadium (Seattle), Seattle, Washington
 Memorial Stadium (Spokane), original name of Joe Albi Stadium in Spokane, Washington

Elsewhere
 Memorial Stadium (St. John's), St. John's, Newfoundland and Labrador, former home of the St. John's Maple Leafs
 Memorial Stadium (Bristol), Bristol Rovers F.C., Bristol form home of Bristol Rugby Club in England

See also 
 Memorial Coliseum (disambiguation)
 Memorial Field (disambiguation)
 Memorial Gymnasium (disambiguation)
 Veterans Memorial Stadium (disambiguation)
 War Memorial Stadium (disambiguation)